John Early (March 17, 1828 – September 2, 1877) was a Canadian American politician. Coming to Rockford, Illinois to practice carpentry, Early rose to become an agent for the New England Mutual Life Insurance Company. A staunch abolitionist, Early was an early supporter of the Republican Party and was voted to the Illinois Senate on the ticket four times. During one of these terms, he was elected President of the Illinois Senate, thus acting Lieutenant Governor of Illinois. Early died before his fourth term was completed.

Biography
John Early was born in Essex County, Ontario on March 17, 1828. He attended public schools and helped his family on the farm. When he was eighteen, he came with his family to Caledonia, Illinois, United States. In 1852, he moved to Rockford to work as a carpenter. He became a noted architectural draftsman and the New England Mutual Life Insurance Company hired him as a general agent. Early became active in politics, led by his abolitionist views, supporting the Free Soil Party. He joined the Republican Party when it formed a few years later.

Early was elected assessor of the City of Rockford three times. In 1869, Illinois Governor John M. Palmer appointed early one of the original trustees of the Reform School at Pontiac, a position he held for one year. In 1870, he was elected to the Illinois Senate for a two-year term. He was re-elected in the next three elections. Shortly after his election as governor in 1873, Richard J. Oglesby was appointed to the United States Senate, making Lieutenant Governor of Illinois John Lourie Beveridge the acting governor. Early was elected to replace Beveridge as acting lieutenant governor (thus President of the Illinois Senate), holding the position from January 23, 1873 to January 8, 1875. Early died from complications of tuberculosis on September 2, 1877 before his fourth Senate term ended. He was buried in Cedar Bluff Cemetery in Rockford.

References

1828 births
1877 deaths
Republican Party Illinois state senators
Lieutenant Governors of Illinois
Pre-Confederation Canadian emigrants to the United States
People from Essex County, Ontario
Politicians from Rockford, Illinois
19th-century deaths from tuberculosis
American carpenters
19th-century American politicians
People from Caledonia, Illinois
Tuberculosis deaths in Illinois